This is a timeline of major events in the Muslim world from 500 AD to 600 AD (13 BH – 23 BH).

Sixth century (500–600)
This century corresponds to approximately 126 - 23 BH.
 570: Year of the Elephant. 50-60 days before the Birth of Muhammed, Abraha (Viceroy of Yemen) with his army of elephants reached Makkah to demolish the Ka'aba.  
 570: Birth of Muhammad
 573: Birth of Abu Bakr. The senior companion of Muhammad and his father-in-law.
 576: Death of Aminah bint Wahb, the mother of Muhammad (approximate date) 
 576: Birth of Uthman. The second cousin and twice son-in-law of Muhammad.
 578: Death of Abdul Muttalib, the grandfather of Muhammad (approximate date) 
 582: Birth of Umar. The senior companion of Muhammad and his father-in-law.
 582: Muhammad's journey to Syria with his uncle Abu Talib. They meet with Bahira, a Christian monk. Bahira notes true  characteristics about the Prophet, which  forces him to ask more and have him discover the "mark of prophets," a mark believed to be carried by all of the prophets of the Abrahimic faiths.  (approximate date). 
 594: Muhammad works for Khadija; leads her trade caravan to Syria and back (approximate date)
 595: Muhammad marries Khadija (approximate date).
 598: Birth of Muhammad and Khadija first child Qasim
 599: Birth of Ali ibn Abi Talib in the city of Mecca. The cousin of Muhammad and his son in law.
 600: Birth of Muhammad and Khadija's eldest daughter and second child Zainab after Qasim 
 600: Death of Muhammad's first child Qasim ibn Muhammad

References

See also
 History of Islam
 Timeline of Muslim history

06
06
Muslim